Schloßberg (Pegnitz) is a mountain of Bavaria, Germany.

References 

Mountains of Bavaria